Aleksandr Pavlovich Lensky (Russian Александр Павлович Ленский; 1 (13) October 1847 in Kishinev – 13 (25) October 1908 in Moscow) was a Russian actor, director and theatrical educator. He was an outstanding figure of theatre under the Russian Empire.

References and notes

1847 births
1908 deaths
Male actors from the Russian Empire
Theatre directors from the Russian Empire
Educators from the Russian Empire
Actors from Chișinău
19th-century people from the Russian Empire
19th-century male actors from the Russian Empire
Russian male stage actors